The 1937 FA Charity Shield was the 24th FA Charity Shield, a football match between the winners of the previous season's First Division and FA Cup competitions. The match was contested by league champions Manchester City and FA Cup winners Sunderland, and was played at Maine Road, the home ground of Manchester City. Manchester City won the game, 2–0.

Match details

References

1937
Charity Shield 1937
Charity Shield 1937
Charity Shield
Fa Charity Shield
1930s in Manchester